Ira Skutch (September 12, 1921 – March 16, 2010) was an American television director, producer, and, in his later years, an author. In the early days of television he produced and directed episodes of Kraft Television Theatre and The Philco Television Playhouse. Skutch also worked as an executive for Goodson-Todman Productions and produced or directed the game shows Play Your Hunch, I've Got a Secret, Match Game, Concentration and many others.

Early life and education
Ira Skutch Jr. was born on September 12, 1921, in New York City. Skutch was the oldest of three children born to parents Ira (1888–1945) and Ethel Skutch. He attended Dartmouth College where he graduated in 1941. Skutch had a younger brother, Robert Skutch, who also graduated from Dartmouth in 1946, and a younger sister Nancy.

Career

Start in television
Skutch started as a page in New York for the National Broadcasting Company. After a few years at NBC, Skutch became the stage manager on some of NBC's and network television's first regularly scheduled programs beginning with Hour Glass in 1946. Hour Glass was the first regularly scheduled variety series shown on network television.

After the end of Hour Glass in 1947, Skutch went on to become the stage manager of The Philco Television Playhouse. Skutch also worked as stage manager for the NBC shows NBC Television Theater, You Are an Artist and Kraft Television Theatre. Skutch also directed, produced and wrote several episodes of The Philco Television Playhouse.

Goodson-Todman Productions
In 1957, producer Mark Goodson hired Skutch to be on staff for Goodson-Todman Productions. One of Skutch's earliest work for Mark Goodson and Bill Todman was as a producer on the game show I've Got a Secret. Skutch also was one of several directors on the original NBC version of Match Game from 1962–1969 and became most notably the producer and judge of the more memorable CBS version of Match Game from 1973–1979, as well as Match Game PM (1975–1981), and the daily syndicated version from 1979–1982.

While at Goodson-Todman, Skutch also worked on the set of the game shows Beat the Clock, What's My Line?, Password, Concentration, Tattletales and Blockbusters.

Skutch left Goodson-Todman in 1983, shortly after Mark Goodson formed his own production company, Mark Goodson Productions, after the death of his partner Bill Todman.

Personal life and death
In his later years, Skutch was the author and co-author of several books published between 1990 and 2008 including I Remember Television, The Days of Live and The DuMont Television Network: What Happened? (co-written with Ted Bergmann).

Skutch died on March 16, 2010, after a several year battle with lymphoma at the age of 88. Skutch died at the home of his daughter Lindsay in the neighborhood of Silver Lake, California.

Filmography

Director

Awards and nominations

Bibliography

References

External links

1921 births
2010 deaths
20th-century American writers
21st-century American writers
American directors
Deaths from cancer in California
Deaths from lymphoma
Writers from New York City
20th-century American male writers